Peter Bonu Johnson (10 May 1963 – 28 July 2019) was a Gambian professional football player and manager.

Career
From 1983 to 1994 Peter Bonu Johnson played for the Gambia national team.

From July 2004 until May 2008 and from May 2012 until June 2013 he worked as an assistant coach with Gambia. He led Gambia U-20 to FIFA World Cup 2007 in Canada. From 9 January 2012 until 28 May 2012 he coached the Gambia national football team. In June 2013, he again was head coach of the Gambia national football team.

On 15 May 2015, Johnson left as manager of Gambia. He died on 28 July 2019.

References

External links

Profile at Soccerpunter.com

1963 births
2019 deaths
Gambian footballers
The Gambia international footballers
Association football defenders
Gambian football managers
Gambia national football team managers
People from Banjul